Acraea baxteri is a butterfly in the family Nymphalidae. It is found in Uganda, Kenya, Tanzania, Malawi and Zambia.

Description

A. baxteri E. Sharpe (54 a). Forewing entirely without black dots, in the basal part yellow-red to reddish as far as the apex of the cell and the middle of cellule 2, in the apical part blackish with three whitish, semitransparent spots in 4 to 6. The discal dots of the hindwing are all present, almost touch one another and stand in a curved row, which runs close to the apex of the cell; hindwing above black as far as the discal dots. Distal half yellow-red with narrow, unspotted, black marginal band; beneath in the basal part as far as the discal dots coffee-brown with distinct black dots, then reddish white and at the distal margin with rust-brown marginal band 3 mm. in breadth and black fringes. . Nyassaland, German and British East Africa. - ab.fuelleborni Thur. has the light subapical spots of the fore wing larger and the marginal band on the upperside of the hindwing about 2 mm. in breadth. Nyassaland. In ab. subsquamia Thur. the wings are more densely scaled and the red colour on the upperside of the hindwing extends nearly to the base of cellules 4 to 6. Usambara.

Subspecies
Acraea baxteri baxteri (southern Tanzania, northern Malawi, Zambia)
Acraea baxteri oldeani Kielland, 1990 (northern Tanzania)
Acraea baxteri philos Le Cerf, 1933 (north-eastern Uganda, Kenya)
Acraea baxteri subsquamia Thurau, 1903 (north-eastern Tanzania)

Biology
The habitat consists of montane forests.

The larvae feed on Urera species.

Taxonomy
It is a member of the Acraea jodutta species group -   but see also Pierre & Bernaud, 2014

References

Butterflies described in 1902
baxteri